Rick (Jackson) Hunter is the name of a fictional character, from:

 the 1980s hit TV series Hunter (1984)
 the Robotech anime series (1985)